Pontefract Academies Trust is a multi-academy trust in the historic northern town of Pontefract, England. It is an exempt charity, regulated by the Department for Education The trust comprises eight academies, including two secondary schools and six primary schools. The CEO is Julian Appleyard.

Primary schools 
The primary schools of the Trust consist of:

 Larks Hill J&I School
 De Lacy Primary School
 Orchard Head Junior Infant & Nursery School
 Carleton Park J&I School
 Rookeries Carleton Junior Infant & Nursery School
 Halfpenny Lane Junior Infant & Nursery School

Secondary schools 
Carleton High School
The King's School

References 

Educational charities based in the United Kingdom
Educational institutions established in 2013
2013 establishments in England
Academies in the City of Wakefield
Multi-academy trusts